Federico Nsue Nguema (born 20 April 1997), also known as Papa, is an Equatorial Guinean professional footballer who plays as a midfielder for Moldovan Super Liga club FC Bălți and the Equatorial Guinea national team.

International career
Nsue made his international debut for Equatorial Guinea on 12 June 2016.

References

External links

1997 births
Living people
Sportspeople from Malabo
Equatoguinean footballers
Association football midfielders
Cano Sport Academy players
FC Dinamo-Auto Tiraspol players
Moldovan Super Liga players
Equatorial Guinea international footballers
Equatoguinean expatriate footballers
Equatoguinean expatriates in Moldova
Expatriate footballers in Moldova